Andrey Vitalyevich Larkov (born 25 November 1989) is a Russian cross-country skier.

Career
He competed in the World Cup 2015 season.
He represented Russia at the FIS Nordic World Ski Championships 2015 in Falun.

Cross-country skiing results
All results are sourced from the International Ski Federation (FIS).

Olympic Games
 2 medals – (1 silver, 1 bronze)

World Championships
 2 medals – (2 silver)

World Cup

Season standings

Individual podiums
2 podiums – (1 , 1 )

Team podiums
 2 podiums – (2 )

Notes

References

External links

1989 births
Living people
People from Zelenodolsk
Russian male cross-country skiers
FIS Nordic World Ski Championships medalists in cross-country skiing
Universiade medalists in cross-country skiing
Cross-country skiers at the 2018 Winter Olympics
Olympic cross-country skiers of Russia
Medalists at the 2018 Winter Olympics
Olympic silver medalists for Olympic Athletes from Russia
Olympic bronze medalists for Olympic Athletes from Russia
Olympic medalists in cross-country skiing
Tour de Ski skiers
Universiade gold medalists for Russia
Competitors at the 2015 Winter Universiade